I Wish We All Could Win is the debut album from the Christian rock band The Afters. The album contains their Dove Award-nominated hit single "Beautiful Love". The album is notable for having two tracks on it used as theme songs. The aforementioned Beautiful Love was used for the MTV reality series "8th and Ocean" while the track "Until The World" was used as the theme song to the ABC Family drama Beautiful People. "You", "All That I Am", and "Someday" all charted on Billboard'''s Christian Songs chart.

Critical response

The website "Soul Purpose" remarked in their review: "The Afters display talent belying their short existence. ... engag[ing] the listener on a personal journey.  A glimpse of the soul is rare indeed [but] the Afters debut effortlessly captures that."  More often than not, critics have approved of the soulful pop rock The Afters deliver on this disc, regardless of its more overt religious themes.

Jesus Freak Hideout gave the album 4½ stars out of 5 commenting that "The Afters' approach to worship is a classy and thoughtful one." Christianity Today.com gave the album 3½ stars out of 5 and added that it effectively "manage[s] to straddle the fence between what Christian and mainstream radio is willing to play." Allmusic gave the album 3½ stars out of 5.

Track listing

 Personnel 

Joshua Havens – vocals, guitar
Matt Fuqua – vocals, guitar
Brad Wigg – bass guitar, vocals
Marc Dodd – drums

Charts

Album
 Top Heatseekers Album: No. 40
 Top Christian Albums: No. 24

Singles

Awards
In 2005, CCM Magazine selected I Wish We All Could Win'' for the Editor's Top 10 Albums.
In 2006, the album was nominated for a Dove Award for Rock/Contemporary Album of the Year at the 37th GMA Dove Awards.
The song "Beautiful Love" was also nominated for a Dove Award for Rock/Contemporary Recorded Song of the Year.

References

2005 debut albums
The Afters albums